Michael Curtis (born in Dallas, Texas) is a retired American soccer defender who played in the World Indoor Soccer League, Major Indoor Soccer League and USISL.  He currently coaches with DFW Tornados.

Player
Curtis attended Bryan Adams High School before entering the U.S. Naval Academy.  He played two seasons at Annapolis before transferring to Dallas Baptist University for his junior and senior seasons.   While at Annopolis, he tied for the Patriot League single game assists record with four in an October 20, 1995 game with West Point.  He spent one season with the Mesquite Kickers in the USISL before signing with the Dallas Sidekicks in 1999.  Curtis and his team mates played two seasons in the World Indoor Soccer League before moving to the second Major Indoor Soccer League in 2002.  He left MISL when the Sidekicks folded following the 2003-2004 season.  In 2005, he played for the USASA team Dallas Roma when it went to the second round of the U.S. Open Cup

Coach
In 2005, the DFW Tornados hired Curtis as an assistant coach.

References

External links
DFW Tornados
Dallas Sidekicks

1975 births
Living people
Sportspeople from Dallas
Soccer players from Dallas
American soccer coaches
American soccer players
Dallas Sidekicks (WISL) players
Dallas Sidekicks (2001–2008 MISL) players
Mesquite Kickers players
USISL players
Association football defenders